The 2014 FIFA World Cup qualification UEFA Group E was a UEFA qualifying group for the 2014 FIFA World Cup. The group comprised Norway, Slovenia, Switzerland, Albania, Cyprus and Iceland.

The group winners, Switzerland, qualified directly for the 2014 FIFA World Cup. Iceland placed among the eight best runners-up and advanced to the play-offs, where they were drawn to play home-and-away matches against Croatia. However, they failed to qualify for the World Cup after drawing the first match and losing the second.

Standings

Matches
A meeting was held in Zürich, Switzerland, on 22 November 2011 to determine the schedule. The delegates failed to reach agreement on the fixtures, which were then determined by a random draw at the conclusion of the meeting.

Goalscorers
There were 71 goals in 30 matches, for an average of 2.37 goals per match.

5 goals

 Milivoje Novaković

4 goals

 Gylfi Sigurðsson
 Kolbeinn Sigþórsson

3 goals

 Birkir Bjarnason
 Jóhann Berg Guðmundsson
 Fabian Schär

2 goals

 Edgar Çani
 Valdet Rama
 Hamdi Salihi
 Efstathios Aloneftis
 Alfreð Finnbogason
 Tarik Elyounoussi
 Brede Hangeland
 Joshua King
 Tim Matavž
 Xherdan Shaqiri
 Mario Gavranović
 Gökhan Inler
 Stephan Lichtsteiner
 Granit Xhaka

1 goal

 Erjon Bogdani
 Odise Roshi
 Armando Sadiku
 Vincent Laban
 Constantinos Makrides
 Kári Árnason
 Daniel Braaten
 Markus Henriksen
 Tom Høgli
 John Arne Riise
 Valter Birsa
 Boštjan Cesar
 Josip Iličić
 Kevin Kampl
 Andraž Kirm
 Rene Krhin
 Marko Šuler
 Tranquillo Barnetta
 Blerim Džemaili
 Michael Lang
 Haris Seferovic

Discipline

Attendances

References

External links
Results and schedule for UEFA Group E (FIFA.com version)
Results and schedule for UEFA Group E (UEFA.com version)

E
2012–13 in Swiss football
qual
2012–13 in Albanian football
2013–14 in Albanian football
2012 in Norwegian football
2013 in Norwegian football
2012–13 in Cypriot football
2013–14 in Cypriot football
2012–13 in Slovenian football
2013–14 in Slovenian football
2012 in Icelandic football
2013 in Icelandic football